SOR Libchavy (Sdružení Opravárenství a Rozvoje) is a Czech manufacturer of buses for urban, intercity and tourist traffic and trolleybuses. It was established in Libchavy in 1991.

History
Until 1990, the company produced and repaired agricultural machinery. Then privatization took place and the new company was registered on 6 December 1991. The manufacturer was established with business intent to focus on the design, production, sale and service of buses. The company management decided for the design of a 7.5 m long bus which would use both the body and chassis of own design and engine-gearbox assembly from prominent world manufacturers.

The production of buses was introduced here by Jaroslav Trnka, the former director of Karosa Vysoké Mýto, and his team. Design works were initiated at the end of 1992 and already at the end of 1993, first buses with Perkins motor and Voith gearbox were sold in 1994 to Kadaň. The company produced a wide range of different sizes of buses (8.5 m, 9.5 m, 10.5 m, 12 m, 13.5 m and 18 m long).

Company SOR Libchavy is currently producing about 750 vehicles per year and is the second largest manufacturer of buses in the Czech Republic, behind Iveco-Karosa. About one third is delivered abroad. The company have offices in the Baltics, Slovakia, Poland, or Russia. Their buses run for example in the Czech capital Prague, or Slovak capital Bratislava.

It manufactures medium-class buses with occupation rate from 25 to 51 sitting and total occupation rate up to 161 passengers. These buses are manufactured on the basis of the company own design. As a matter of course, they provide service, repairs and sale of spare parts.

In 2015, SOR Libchavy recorded an increase of production by 31% and revenues increased by 42%. The company currently sells (2022) city (SOR NS, NSG, BN, BNG, IBN), intercity (SOR C, CN, CNG, ICN, LH) and electric buses (SOR EBN, NS) and trolleybuses (SOR TNS).

See also
Karosa
TEDOM

References

External links 
 

1991 establishments in Czechoslovakia
Bus manufacturers of the Czech Republic
Vehicle manufacturing companies established in 1991
Czech brands
Trolleybus manufacturers
Electric vehicle manufacturers of the Czech Republic